Juan Cerros (born September 25, 1976 in Monterrey, Mexico), is a Mexican former professional baseball pitcher who played with the Cincinnati Reds of Major League Baseball (MLB). He is currently the pitching coach for the Saraperos de Saltillo of the Mexican League.

External links

1976 births
Living people
Baseball players from Nuevo León
Binghamton Mets players
Broncos de Reynosa players
Cincinnati Reds players
Dorados de Chihuahua players
Louisville Bats players
Major League Baseball pitchers
Major League Baseball players from Mexico
Mexican expatriate baseball players in the United States
Mexican League baseball pitchers
Norfolk Tides players
Pericos de Puebla players
Piratas de Campeche players
Saraperos de Saltillo players
Sportspeople from Monterrey
St. Lucie Mets players
Sultanes de Monterrey players
Tuneros de San Luis Potosí players